Saado Abdel Salam Fouflia (born 23 November 1997) is a Palestinian professional footballer who plays as a defender for Greek Super League 2 club Rodos.

Career statistics

Club

Notes

References

1997 births
Living people
Palestinian footballers
Association football defenders
Panetolikos F.C. players
Platanias F.C. players
Ermis Aradippou FC players
Rodos F.C. players
Palestinian expatriate footballers
Expatriate footballers in Greece
Expatriate footballers in Cyprus
Footballers from Agrinio